Karşıyaka Tram is a  urban light rail transit (LRT) system in Karşıyaka district of Izmir, Turkey and is one of the two lines of Tram İzmir. The line with 14 stations began operation in April 2017.

The tram line runs between Alaybey and Mavişehir railway stations. The tram line is a single track from Alaybey to Karşıyaka Pier, and runs from there on to Suat Taşer Amphitheatre on double track parallel to the coastline. The line terminates at Ataşehir station at the end of the Mavişehir railway depot. It is part of the Karşıyaka and Konak Tram project of İzmir Metropolitan Municipality, which cost nearly ₺450 million (approx. US$ 120 million). Construction of the tracks started in April 2015, and completed in January 2017. The test runs continued until April 2017, and the tram line went in service on April 11, 2017.

The tram line is operated by İzmir Metro. The line is served by 17 tramcars produced by Hyundai Rotem plant in Adapazarı. The double-ended -long five-module tramcars are each 43.1 t heavy. They have 48 seating capacity, and can carry up to 285 passengers each. The electrification system of the tramcars is 750 V DC. The line has a  communications-based train control (CBTC) signalling system.

The metropolitan mayor announced that the ride is free of charge for a duration of the first fifty days until the beginning of June 2017.

It is projected that the line will be extended to Çiğli railway station, the İzmir Kâtip Çelebi University campus and the İzmir Atatürk Organized Industrial Zone.

See also
Trams İzmir
Konak Tram

References

Tram transport in İzmir
Railway lines opened in 2017
2017 establishments in Turkey
Karşıyaka District